Silvia Olari  is the debut album by Italian pop singer Silvia Olari, released on March 27, 2009, by Warner Bros. Records. Luca Jurman collaborated as musician and arranger for the album. Nek wrote the lead single and opening track, "Fino all'Anima".

Track listing
"Fino all'Anima" — 3:47
"Apro le mie Ali" — 3:49
"Everyday" — 4:02
"Che Posso Darti Ancora" — 3:33
"Rivoluzione" — 4:17
"Raccontami di te" — 3:43
"Wise Girl" — 4:06

Charts

References

Silvia Olari albums
2009 debut albums